Provincial elections are scheduled to be held in Sindh within 60 days after the dissolution of the Sindh Assembly, which is set to dissolve on August 2023, unless dissolved earlier: in which case, the election shall be held within 90 days after dissolution. This means that the election must be held by or before 12 October 2023.

Electoral system 
The 168 seats of the Sindh Assembly consist of 130 general seats, whose members are elected by the first-past-the-post voting system through single-member constituencies. 29 seats are reserved for women and 9 seats are reserved for non-Muslims. The members on these seats are elected through proportional representation based on the total number of general seats secured by each political party.

Background 
In the 2018 election, the Pakistan People's Party (PPP) won 99 seats, gaining a majority in the Provincial Assembly. It became the third consecutive time that the PPP was able to form government in Sindh Since 2008.

The Pakistan Tehreek-e-Insaf (PTI) became the largest party in Karachi by winning 21 out of 44 seats from the city. It was the first time since 1988 that any party other than the MQM-P got the mandate to represent the city on the provincial and national levels. Overall, the PTI won 30 seats and became the second largest party, and the largest party in the opposition.

The Muttahida Qaumi Movement - Pakistan (MQM-P), which was the largest and most popular party in Karachi, Hyderabad and other urban areas of Sindh, faced a tough challenge from the rising popularity of the PTI and received its worst ever result. It won only 21 seats and became the third largest party in the province. The MQM-P also opted to join the opposition.

In April 2022, after circumstances arising during a political crisis in Pakistan after the successful no-confidence motion against Prime Minister Imran Khan, the MQM-P left the opposition and joined the PPP-led provincial government.

In September 2022, Former Prime Minister and Leader of Pakistan Tehreek-e-Insaf Imran Khan announced to liberate Sindh from Zardari Mafia. He stated that Pakistan Tehreek-e-Insaf will team up with the youth to liberate the poor and oppressed people of Interior Sindh from Feudal lords of Pakistan People's Party. This was the very first time some party leader threatened dominance of People's Party in Sindh and upcoming election will be a battle for survival of PPP in interior Sindh as Pakistan Tehreek-e-Insaf has support of the people of Karachi and Hyderabad and will be able to gain seats in Interior Sindh if they campaign well.

Merger of MQM factions 
Since the appointment of Kamran Tessori as the Governor of Sindh, efforts began to merge breakaway factions of the MQM-P like the Pak Sarzameen Party (PSP) and the Farooq Sattar group back into the MQM-P to unite their vote bank to overcome the growing popularity of Pakistan Tehreek-e-Insaf (PTI). The Mohajir Qaumi Movement Pakistan - Haqiqi (MQM-H) was also approached, but refused to merge the with the MQM-P.

On the evening of 12 January 2023 Mustafa Kamal, the leader of the PSP, and Farooq Sattar announced their merger with the MQM-P in a press conference.

Opinion polls

Notes

References 

Elections in Sindh
2023 elections in Pakistan
Sindh